The Public University of El Alto (Spanish: Universidad Pública de El Alto), also known by its acronym UPEA, is a public university based in the city of El Alto, Bolivia. The public institution has 8 areas and 37 careers in the areas of medicine, engineering, socio-political-economic and technology. Within its operation, it is part of the organic statute approved in 2007. According to the Ranking Web de Universidades, an online ranking site for Bolivian colleges, UPEA ranks 42 of the best universities in Bolivia.

History 
In 1957, social institutions of El Alto signed agreements with the Higher University of San Andrés (Universidad Mayor de San Andrés, UMSA) in the city of La Paz, to create a faculty with technical careers. The residents within El Alto wanted the university to have professional training courses not only at a technical level. For this, the inhabitants of this city began a series of mobilizations to achieve a university that has a greater academic offer.

On 5 September 2000, after social mobilizations, the law 2115 was promulgated, which determined of having the Public University in El Alto, the same determines that the UPEA would have autonomy in 5 years during which time it would be in charge of a council made up of the Bolivian Ministry of Education and other government agencies.

According to the law of its creation, the entity with the highest decision in the university would be the Institutional Development Council (CDI), in which members of social organizations of the city of El Alto who had little relationship with the work were inserted academically. The UPEA began a process of institutionalization, therefore the University Council was reinstated.

Railing accident of 2021 

On 2 March 2021 at around 8:00 am, students of the university rallied together in order to protest against the Economic, Financial and Administrative Science branch of the school. The protest occurred within the fourth floor of the school with around 40 students simultaneously rallying. With the abundant presence of students in a narrow passageway, the safety railings collapsed which some students were leaning on during the incident. Ten students fell to the first floor and two students fell to the third floor. Sources say that eight students have died and four were left wounded.

References

External links

  

Educational institutions established in 2000
Buildings and structures in La Paz Department (Bolivia)
Universities in Bolivia
2000 establishments in Bolivia